Buddy Ryan may refer to:
 Buddy Ryan, an American football coach
 Buddy Ryan (baseball), a major league Baseball outfielder
 Buddy Ryan (character), a character in the TV series Night Court